Shmurda She Wrote is the debut EP by American rapper Bobby Shmurda, released on November 10, 2014, by Epic Records.

Singles
On July 25, 2014, the EP's debut single, "Hot Nigga" was released. The song was produced by Jahlil Beats. In an effort to promote the EP, Shmurda released "Bobby Bitch" on September 30, 2014.

Commercial performance
The EP debuted at number 79 on the Billboard 200 chart, selling 20,000 copies. Since its release, it has sold 106,000, including 85,000 album sales due to streaming. The EP charted on the Billboard 200 chart for two weeks total.

Track listing
Credits adapted from Tidal.

Charts

Certifications

References

2014 debut EPs
Hip hop EPs
Bobby Shmurda albums